Henry Lyons (born 1942) is former President of the National Baptist Convention.

Henry Lyons may also refer to:

Henry A. Lyons (1809–1872), second Chief Justice of the California Supreme Court
Sir Henry George Lyons (1864–1944), geologist and director of the Science Museum in London
Henry Lyons, 1st Baron Ennisdale (1877–1963), British soldier, politician and businessman

See also
Harry Lyons (disambiguation)
Henry Lyon (disambiguation)